Cícero Vítor dos Santos Júnior (born 29 July 1982 in Delmiro Gouveia), or simply Vítor, is a Brazilian professional football player who currently plays for Aparecida Esporte Clube as a right back.

Honours

Club
Goiás
Goiás State League: 2004, 2006, 2012, 2013
Campeonato Brasileiro Série B: 2012

Individual
Bola de Prata: 2008

Contract
30 March 2010 to 31 December 2013.

External links

zerozero.pt 
goiasesporteclube.com 
globoesporte 

1982 births
Living people
Brazilian footballers
Campeonato Brasileiro Série A players
Campeonato Brasileiro Série B players
Campeonato Brasileiro Série C players
Clube Recreativo e Atlético Catalano players
Goiás Esporte Clube players
Sociedade Esportiva Palmeiras players
Sport Club do Recife players
Cruzeiro Esporte Clube players
Santa Cruz Futebol Clube players
Goiânia Esporte Clube players
Association football defenders